Earthquake Baroque or Seismic Baroque is a style of Baroque architecture found in the former Spanish East Indies and Guatemala, both prior Spanish ruled territories, which suffered destructive earthquakes during the 17th century and 18th century, where large public buildings, such as churches, were rebuilt in a Baroque style during the Spanish Colonial periods in those countries.

Similar events led to the Pombaline architecture in Lisbon following the 1755 Lisbon earthquake and Sicilian Baroque in Sicily following the 1693 earthquake.

Characteristics
In the Spanish East Indies, destruction of earlier churches from frequent earthquakes have made the church proportion lower and wider; side walls were made thicker and heavily buttressed for stability during shaking. The upper structures were made with lighter materials. Instead of lighter materials thinner walls were introduced by progressively decreasing in thickness to the topmost levels.

Bell towers are usually lower and stouter compared to towers in less seismically active regions of the world.  Towers are thicker in the lower levels, progressively narrowing to the topmost level. In some churches of the Philippines, aside from functioning as watchtowers against pirates, some bell towers are detached from the main church building to avoid damage in case of a falling bell tower due to an earthquake.

See also 
Church architecture

 Spanish Colonial architecture
 Churrigueresque
 Plateresque

References

External links
"Earthquake Baroque: Paoay Church in the Ilocos" from the Heritage Conservation Society
 San Pedro de las Huertas, an Earthquake Baroque church in Guatemala
Earthquake baroque churches of the Philippines

Baroque architectural styles

Baroque architecture in the Philippines
Earthquake engineering